Vishunpur vasant is a Gram panchayat in hajipur,  vaishali district, bihar.

Geography
This panchayat is located at

Panchayat office
samudayik bhawan Mansingpur Rajauli

Nearest City/Town
Hajipur (Distance KM)

Nearest major road highway or river
other roadway
railway line

compass

Villages in panchayat
There are  villages in this panchayat

References

Gram panchayats in Bihar
Villages in Vaishali district
Vaishali district
Hajipur